John W. Feighan (April 5, 1845 – May 28, 1898) was an American politician in the state of Washington. He served in the Washington House of Representatives from 1889 to 1891, during which time he also served as Speaker of the House.

References

Republican Party members of the Washington House of Representatives
1845 births
1898 deaths
19th-century American politicians